Feng Fei (born 18 February 1983 in Chengdu, Sichuan, China) is a Chinese baseball player who was a member of Team China at the 2008 Summer Olympics.

Sports career
1990-1997 Chengdu Jinniu District Spare-time Sports School;
1997–Present Sichuan Taipingsi Air Sports School Table Tennis, Badminton and *Tennis Administrative Center;
2003 National Team

Major performances
2005 National Games - 3rd;
2004/2005 National League - 1st;
2005 Asian Championship - 3rd

References
Profile 2008 Olympics Team China

1983 births
2006 World Baseball Classic players
2009 World Baseball Classic players
Baseball players at the 2008 Summer Olympics
Baseball players at the 2010 Asian Games
Baseball players from Sichuan
Chinese baseball players
Living people
Olympic baseball players of China
Sportspeople from Chengdu
Asian Games competitors for China